Chad E. Kolarik (born January 26, 1986) is an American former professional ice hockey right wing. He played in the National Hockey League (NHL) with the Columbus Blue Jackets and New York Rangers.

Playing career
As a youth, Kolarik played in the 2000 Quebec International Pee-Wee Hockey Tournament with the Philadelphia Flyers minor ice hockey team.

Kolarik was drafted 199th overall in the 2004 NHL Entry Draft by the Phoenix Coyotes while he was playing for the University of Michigan. After completing his senior year with the Wolverines in the 2007–08 season, Chad signed a three-year entry level contract with the Coyotes on April 13, 2008. He was then assigned to their affiliate, the San Antonio Rampage of the AHL, for the Calder Cup playoffs.

On March 3, 2010, Kolarik was traded from the Coyotes to the Columbus Blue Jackets in exchange for Alexandre Picard. He made his NHL debut for the Blue Jackets on April 5, 2010 against the St. Louis Blues.

On November 11, 2010, Kolarik was traded from the Blue Jackets to the New York Rangers in exchange for Dane Byers. He earned his first NHL point for the Rangers with an assist on a goal by Brandon Prust against the Carolina Hurricanes on January 20, 2011.

There was speculation that Kolarik would make the New York Rangers squad in the 2011–12 season, but he missed the entire year after he tore his ACL in training camp.

On January 24, 2013, Kolarik was traded from the Rangers to the Pittsburgh Penguins in exchange for Benn Ferriero.

After a strong ending of the 2012–13 season with the Wilkes-Barre/Scranton Penguins, Kolarik chose to move overseas, signing a two-year deal with Linköpings HC of the Swedish Hockey League. During the final season of his contract in Sweden, Kolarik sought a release in October, 2014, to sign a contract with Russian club, Avangard Omsk of the Kontinental Hockey League.

On April 30, 2015, he agreed to a one-year contract with the Kloten Flyers of the Swiss NLA. Kolarik made 38 NLA appearances for the Kloten squad, scoring 16 goals and assisting on twelve more. He left the team after the 2015–16 season and moved to Germany, signing with Adler Mannheim of the Deutsche Eishockey Liga (DEL).

Helping Adler Mannheim claim the DEL championship in the 2018–19 season, Kolarik left as a free agent for neighbouring league, the EBEL, signing a one-year deal with Austrian outfit, EC Red Bull Salzburg, on May 1, 2019. In his lone season in the EBEL, Kolarik posted 43 points in 48 games as the team's second leading scorer. He collected 4 playoff points in 3 games before the season was ended prematurely due to the COVID-19 pandemic.

On July 2, 2020, Kolarik ended his tenure with Red Bull Salzburg by announcing his retirement from professional hockey after 12 years.

Personal life
He married University of Michigan gymnastic Kylee Botterman in August 2011 in Botterman's hometown of Chicago, Illinois. Kolarik proposed to Botterman in December 2010 after a three-year, long-distance relationship. Together they have one son, Christian.

Career statistics

Regular season and playoffs

International

Awards and honors

References

External links

1986 births
Living people
Adler Mannheim players
American men's ice hockey centers
Arizona Coyotes draft picks
Avangard Omsk players
Columbus Blue Jackets players
Connecticut Whale (AHL) players
Hartford Wolf Pack players
Ice hockey players from Pennsylvania
EHC Kloten players
Linköping HC players
Michigan Wolverines men's ice hockey players
New York Rangers players
Olympic ice hockey players of the United States
Ice hockey players at the 2018 Winter Olympics
People from Abington Township, Montgomery County, Pennsylvania
EC Red Bull Salzburg players
San Antonio Rampage players
Springfield Falcons players
Syracuse Crunch players
USA Hockey National Team Development Program players
Wilkes-Barre/Scranton Penguins players
AHCA Division I men's ice hockey All-Americans